is a passenger railway station in the town of Naganohara, Gunma Prefecture, Japan, operated by East Japan Railway Company (JR East).

Lines
Naganohara-Kusatsuguchi Station is a station on the Agatsuma Line, and is located 42.0 kilometers from the terminus of the line at Shibukawa Station.

Station layout
The station consists of a single island platform serving two tracks connected to the station building by a footbridge. The station has three floors and a toilet. There is a JR Bus terminal adjacent to the station.

Platforms

History

The station opened on 2 January 1945, initially named . It was renamed to its present name on December 1, 1991.

A new station building was formally completed on 27 July 2013, opening to the public from 1 August 2013.

Bus routes

Highway Buses
The Naganohara-Kusatsuguchi bus stop located near Agatsuma River
 "Joshu Yumeguri" For Shinjuku Highway Bus Terminal via Nerima Station・Nakano-Sakaue Station (operated by JR Bus)
 "Tokyo Yumeguri" For Tokyo Station (operated by JR Bus)

Route buses
 Track 1,2（JR Bus）
 "Shiga Kusatsu Kogen Line"
For Kusatsu Onsen Bus Terminal
 Track 3（JR Bus） 
"Shiga Kusatsu Kogen Line" and "Shirane Kazan Line" 
For Kusatsu Onsen Bus Terminal or Shirane Volcano（JR Bus）
 Track 4 (Kusakaru Kotsu)
 For Kita-Karuizawa
 Track 5 (Nakanojo Municipal Bus entrust Rose Queen Kotsu) 
Kuni Village Line
 For Lake Nozori via Hanashiki Onsen

Surrounding area
 
 
 
 Naganohara Post Office
 Naganohara City Hall

See also
 List of railway stations in Japan

References

External links

 JR East Station information 

Railway stations in Gunma Prefecture
Agatsuma Line
Stations of East Japan Railway Company
Railway stations in Japan opened in 1945
Naganohara, Gunma